The third season of La Ferme Célébrités en Afrique, a French TV reality show, aired on TF1 from January 29, 2010 to April 9, 2010.
It was presented by Benjamin Castaldi and Jean-Pierre Foucault. This season was won by Mickaël Vendetta, he won €110 000 for his chosen charity, "Secours populaire français" and take place in Africa.

Contestants

Nomination

La Ferme Célébrités
2010 French television seasons